Tracy Leslie (born October 24, 1957) is an American former professional stock car racing driver. He last raced in the ARCA Racing Series against his son, Billy. He also raced in the NASCAR Winston Cup Series and NASCAR Busch Series.

Early career 
Leslie ran his first race in 1975, and soon began racing throughout the Midwest, winning championships at Mt. Clemens and Toledo Speedway and Delaware Speedway Park.  Later he moved down south to compete in the ARCA series, winning the championship and Rookie of the Year honors in 1988. He collected three more wins over the next two years as well. He made his NASCAR debut in 1989 at the Coca-Cola 600, starting 29th and finishing 25th in a car owned by A. J. Foyt. He ran another race that year for Foyt at Michigan, finishing 20th. In 1990, Leslie ran the 600 in his own #72, but suffered engine failure. Later in the year, he teamed with owner Ron Parker to field the #72 Detroit Gasket Chevy. He ran two more Cup races in the entry, both resulting in DNF’s.

1991-1995 
Leslie made his Busch Series debut in 1991 at the Goody’s 300 in the Detroit Gasket Oldsmobile, but was involved in a lap 1 crash and did not finish the race. He ran the season full-time, posting a second-place finish at Indianapolis Raceway Park, and finished fifteenth in points. The next year, he had ten top-tens and finished fifteenth in points again. In 1993, Leslie won his first pole at the Champion 300, but finished 34th due to engine failure. Later, at IRP, Leslie took his only career win in the Busch Series. He finished eleventh in points at the end of the year. He would finish eleventh in points the next year as well, posting eight top-tens. In 1995, he won his second at pole at Dover, but was released from the 72 for the last two races of the year, but Parker fielded a second entry for him.

1996-2000 
In 1996, Leslie began running a limited schedule in his #11. He ran eight races, his best finish a 10th at IRP. He also attempted the Daytona 500 in the Cup series in a car owned by Phil Barkdoll, but he failed to qualify. In 1997, he signed to drive the #63 Lysol Pontiac Grand Prix for Hensley Motorsports. He had five top-tens and finished seventeenth in points. He returned to the ride in 1998, his best finish a thirteenth before he was released. He has not raced in NASCAR since.

In 1999, he returned to the ARCA series driving a car owned by Jack Bowsher, and picked up wins at Winchester Speedway and Salem Speedway. He moved to a part-time schedule in 2000, running 8 of 20 races, and picked up his last win at Salem. Leslie qualified for five races in 2001, with a best finish of sixth at  Pocono. Leslie attempt to qualify at Toledo in 2004, but didn't make the field. He hasn't competed in any major form of motor sports since.

Motorsports career results

NASCAR
(key) (Bold – Pole position awarded by qualifying time. Italics – Pole position earned by points standings or practice time. * – Most laps led.)

Winston Cup Series

Xfinity Series

External links 

1957 births
ARCA Menards Series drivers
American Speed Association drivers
Living people
NASCAR drivers
NASCAR team owners
People from Mount Clemens, Michigan
Racing drivers from Detroit
Racing drivers from Michigan
Sportspeople from Metro Detroit
A. J. Foyt Enterprises drivers